The San Francisco Boys Chorus  (SFBC) is a choir for boys consisting of 230 members based in San Francisco with additional campuses in Oakland, San Mateo, and San Rafael. It is known officially as "San Francisco's Singing Ambassadors to the World".

The group was founded in 1948 by Madi Bacon and Gaetano Merola to provide singers for the San Francisco Opera. It has been directed by Ian Robertson since 1996, prior to which it was directed by Laura Kakis Serper from 1993. Past directors also include Edwin Flath, William Ballard and Louis Magor with support from training group directors Juell Gainey (Juelle Hinman) Judy Breneman (Dodge), Sarah Keene, Donald Osborne...

Public appearances

On January 20, 2009, forty-three boys from the SFBC performed at the presidential inauguration ceremony for United States President Barack Obama at the U.S. Capitol, along with members of the San Francisco Girls Chorus (a separate organization). They sang for 20 minutes in front of an audience of millions.

Boys from the SFBC have regularly performed in productions of the San Francisco Opera and San Francisco Symphony.

Among others, the group has performed for Colin Powell, Tipper Gore, Pope John Paul II, Queen Elizabeth II, Prince Charles, Arnold Schwarzenegger, and Mikhail Gorbachev.
In 1997 the group performed at the wedding of Andre Agassi and Brooke Shields in Monterey, California.

Notable alumni
Alumni of the group include author Daniel Handler, better known under his pen name Lemony Snicket, actor Joshua Jackson, singer Christopheren Nomura, violinist Donald Weilerstein, cellist Paul Tobias, the late conductor Calvin Simmons, conductors Peter Rubardt, Alan Yamamoto, Joe Illick and Phillip Kelsey, and a cappella director/singer Deke Sharon.

Discography
 Vince Guaraldi – Vince Guaraldi with the San Francisco Boys Chorus (1968)
 San Francisco Boys Chorus 21st Anniversary Album (1969)
 We Hear America Singing: 200 years of American Music with the Orchestra of the Marin Symphony Association (1976)
 Neil Young – Landing on Water (1986)
 San Francisco Symphony & Chorus / Herbert Blomstedt – Carl Orff: Carmina Burana (1991), winner of 1992 Grammy Award for Best Choral Performance
 We're On Our Way (2000)
 Moving On (2003)
 It's the Most Wonderful Time of the Year (2009)
 The San Francisco Boys Chorus Sings Vivaldi (2009)
 The San Francisco Boys Chorus Sings Fauré and Messager (2010)
 San Francisco Boys Chorus Sings Live (2012)

References

External links

 

Choirs of children
Choirs in the San Francisco Bay Area
Musical groups from San Francisco
Non-profit organizations based in San Francisco
Arts organizations based in the San Francisco Bay Area
Musical groups established in 1948
1948 establishments in California